Punjabi Americans, are Americans whose ancestry originates wholly or partly from the Punjab region of India and Pakistan. There are over 300,000 Punjabi Americans, many of whom were Sikhs who first settled in California's Central Valley to do agricultural work.

Sikhs
Sikhs have been a part of the American populace for more than 130 years. At the turn of the 19th century, the state of Punjab of British India was hit hard by British practices of mercantilism. Many Sikhs emigrated to the United States and began arriving to work on farms in California. They traveled via Hong Kong to Angel Island, California, the western counterpart to Ellis Island in New York.

"Some Sikhs worked in lumber mills of Oregon or in railroad construction and for some Sikhs, it was on a railway line, which allowed other Sikhs who were working as migrant laborers to come into the town on festival days".

Due to discrimination from Anglo Americans many early Punjabi immigrants in California married Mexican Americans, forming a sizable Punjabi Mexican American community. Punjabi farmers were also able to circumvent laws prohibiting their ownership of property by operating through American bankers.

Role in America
Most Sikhs started life in America as farm labourers, with many eventually becoming landowners and successful farmers. In 1956, Dalip Singh Saund became the first Asian American to be elected to the United States House of Representatives. At present Amarjit Singh Buttar is perhaps the only turbaned Sikh who holds elected public office. He was elected in December 2001 to the Vernon, Connecticut Board of Education for a four-year term. He has also been recently selected as the chairman of the board. Bobby Jindal, the governor of Louisiana is also of Punjabi descent, as well as Nikki Haley, the former United States Ambassador to the United Nations and the 116th governor of South Carolina. 

Many Punjabi Americans have become successful in technology-related fields. Vinod Dham helped to develop the Pentium processor while Vinod Khosla and Sabeer Bhatia co-founded Sun Microsystems and Hotmail respectively. Aneesh Chopra served as the first Chief Technology Officer of the United States (CTO), appointed by President Barack Obama.

Notable Punjabi Americans

Activists 

 Kala Bagai, immigration activist
 Bhagat Singh Thind, soldier and spiritualist. Fought for Indian-American citizenship rights in the US
 Sakharam Ganesh Pandit, lawyer and civil rights activist. Lawyer of Bhagat Singh Thind in United States v. Bhagat Singh Thind
 Khizr and Ghazala Khan, parents of US Army captain Humuyun Khan and anti-Islamophobia activists

Military 

 Humayun Khan, US Army officer who was killed in the Iraq War
 Uday Singh, soldier of Indian descent who died in Operation Iraqi Freedom

Musicians 

 Heems, rap artist and former member of alternative hip-hop group Das Racist
 Raveena Aurora, singer-songwriter

Politics 

 Bobby Jindal, governor of Louisiana
 Nikki Haley, governor of South Carolina and former United States Ambassador to the United Nations
 Kashmir "Kash" Gill, former mayor of Yuba City, California
 Ravinder "Ravi" Bhalla, mayor of Hoboken, New Jersey and first turban-wearing Sikh mayor of a U.S. city
 Dalip Singh Saund, first Asian American and first member of a non-Abrahamic faith elected to the House of Representatives
 Ro Khanna, U.S. Representative for California's 17th District

See also 

 List of Indian Americans
 List of Pakistani Americans

References

Indian diaspora in the United States
Pakistani diaspora in the United States
 
Asian-American society
American people of Indian descent
 
Pakistani American